Tadeusz Jaworski (born 26 September 1945) is a retired Polish sprinter who specialized in the 100 and 200 metres.

He was born in Poznań and represented the club Energetyka Poznań. At the inaugural 1964 European Junior Championships he won the silver medal in the 200 metres, as well as a gold medal in the 4 x 100 metres relay and a silver medal in the medley relay where he ran the opening leg. At the 1967 European Indoor Games he won a silver medal in the 4 x 300 metres relay, which he ran together with Edward Romanowski, Jan Balachowski and Edmund Borowski. He also competed in the 50 metres without reaching the final.

References

1945 births
Living people
Polish male sprinters
Sportspeople from Poznań